SoFi Technologies, Inc. (commonly known as SoFi) is an American online personal finance company and online bank. Based in San Francisco, SoFi provides financial products including student and auto loan refinancing, mortgages, personal loans, credit card, investing, and banking through both mobile app and desktop interfaces.

History

2011–13
SoFi, short for Social Finance Inc., was founded in the summer of 2011 by Mike Cagney, Dan Macklin, James Finnigan, and Ian Brady, four students who met at the Stanford Graduate School of Business. The founders hoped SoFi could provide more affordable options for those taking on debt to fund their education. The company's inaugural loan program was a pilot at Stanford; for this pilot program, 40 alumni loaned about $2 million to approximately 100 students, for an average of $20,000 per student.

In September 2012, SoFi raised $77.2 million, led by Baseline Ventures, with participation from DCM and Renren. Additional investors included Ron Suber.

On October 2, 2013, SoFi announced that it had raised $500 million in debt and equity to fund and refinance student loans. This total funding amount came from $90 million in equity, $151 million in debt, and $200 million in bank participations, with the remaining capital from alumni and community investors.  The $151 million in debt includes a $60 million line of credit from Morgan Stanley, and a $41 million line of credit from Bancorp.

As of September 2013, SoFi had funded $200 million in loans to 2500 borrowers at the company's 100 eligible schools.

In November 2013, SoFi announced a deal with Barclays and Morgan Stanley to create a bond backed by peer-to-peer student loans, which would create the first securitization of these loans to receive a credit rating.

2014–18
In April 2014, SoFi raised $80 million in a Series C round led by Discovery Capital Management with participation from Peter Thiel, Wicklow Capital, and existing investors. Money was raised to expand the footprint of the company's student loan refinancing business and to extend into new products like mortgages and personal loans.

In February 2015, the company announced a $200 million funding round led by Third Point Management. That same month, the company officially began offering personal loans. By March 2015, the company was offering mortgages in more than 20 states, up from its initial launch that included under ten states in October 2014. By April 2015, the company had funded more than $2 billion in loans, including student loan refinancing, mortgages, personal loans, and MBA loans. To celebrate its $2 billion milestone, SoFi announced a contest, #2BillionTogether, to pay off one of its members student loans. In September 2015, former SEC Chairman Arthur Levitt was added as an advisor. The firm also raised a $1 billion round of investment from SoftBank and said it had funded $4 billion in loans.

In May 2016, SoFi became the first startup online lender to receive a triple-A rating from Moody's. In September 2016, SoFi launched SoFi at Work, an employee benefit program to reduce student debt and build financial wellness, and announced it has more than 600 corporate partners. As of October 2016, SoFi has funded more than $12 billion in total loan volume and has 175,000 members. In February 2017, it was announced that Social Finance Inc. raised an additional $500 million from an investor group led by Silver Lake, and also including SoftBank, to help support global expansion.

On September 11, 2017, CEO Mike Cagney announced he would resign by the end of year due to allegations of sexual harassment and skirting risk and compliance controls. Announced January 23, 2018, Anthony Noto resigned from his position as COO of Twitter, to become the CEO of SoFi. In April 2018, SoFi announced that Michelle Gill, who previously worked at TPG and Goldman Sachs, was joining the company as Chief Financial Officer.

In October 2018, SoFi settled FTC charges, agreeing to stop making false claims about savings from student loan refinancing. The FTC alleged that SoFi had been making such false claims since April 2016. In February 2019, the FTC announced its approval of the final consent order under which SoFi is prohibited from misrepresenting to consumers how much money consumers will save or have saved using its products and from making any claims about any such savings unless the claims are backed up with reliable evidence. The order expires on February 22, 2039, or 20 years from the Commission's most recent date of filing a complaint in federal court reporting any misconduct that occurs later.

2019–22 
In May 2019, SoFi closed $500 million in a single funding round led by Qatar Investment Authority. In September 2019, SoFi inked a 20-year deal with the Los Angeles Rams and the Los Angeles Chargers of the National Football League (NFL) for the naming rights to SoFi Stadium, in Inglewood, California. The deal, which is worth $30 million annually, is a record for any naming rights for a sports venue.

In April 2020, SoFi acquired Salt Lake City payments firm Galileo for $1.2 billion in stock and cash, and Hong Kong-based investment app 8 Securities.

SoFi merged with a SPAC to go public at a $9 billion valuation at the end of the first quarter of 2021. After going public, the overall valuation of SoFi increased by over 12%.

In January 2022, SoFi received approval from the OCC for a national bank charter. In February 2022, SoFi purchased Golden Pacific Bancorp, owner of Sacramento, California based Golden Pacific Bank, for $22.3 million. This allows SoFi to hold loans for investment as opposed to selling them to outside investors. The previous bank charter application was abandoned with this purchase.

Model
SoFi originally utilized an alumni-funded lending model that connected students and recent graduates with alumni and institutional investors via school-specific student loan funds.  Investors received a financial return and borrowers received rates lower than the federal government offered. The company sought to minimize defaults by focusing on low-risk students and graduates.

As SoFi's product offerings expanded to include mortgages, mortgage refinancing, and personal loans, the company moved away from an alumni-funded model to a non-traditional underwriting approach focused on lending to financially responsible individuals.

They also offer cash management (checking) accounts and an investment platform that includes brokerage and robo-advisor services.

Products

Lending 
Personal loans, student loans, home loans, and loan refinancing are all part of SoFi's lending services. With over $6 billion dollars in loans issued, SoFi has become one of the largest marketplace lenders. They continue to maintain a policy of no fees for their loans, aside from the interest.

Investing

In 2018, SoFi introduced commission and fee-free trades of stocks and exchange-traded funds under the name SoFi Invest (formerly SoFi Wealth). This service is now called SoFi Active investing.

SoFi Wealth, LLC had $523 million under management as of December 2021. Services offered also include traditional IRA, Roth IRA, and SEP IRA retirement accounts.

Cryptocurrency trading
In February 2019, SoFi launched a partnership with Coinbase to offer cryptocurrency trading. SoFi offers trading of Bitcoin, Ethereum, Litecoin, and more than 17 other crypto assets to users in every U.S state apart from Hawaii, New Jersey, and West Virginia. Cryptocurrency transactions are one of SoFi's only products that have fees.

Banking

SoFi offers an online cash management account that acts as a hybrid checking/savings account. They obtain FDIC insurance through their partner banks: MetaBank, Hills Bank and Trust Company, EagleBank, East West Bank, Tristate Bank Capital Bank, and Wells Fargo.

In July 2020, SoFi launched a partnership with Samsung Pay to launch Samsung Money by SoFi, a cash management checking/savings accounts, with a digital and physical debit card.

In late 2020, SoFi launched its first-ever credit card, with the goal of incentivizing healthy financial habits.

In 2022, SoFi launched SoFi Money under SoFi Bank, a checking and savings account. The previous cash management account was deprecated to pay zero percent interest, which caused controversy.

Credit score monitoring and budgeting tool 
SoFi Relay, a credit score monitoring and budgeting tool, is available to anyone who registers a free SoFi account. The service allows users to track their money in bank, credit card, investment, and loan balances and transactions as well as set financial goals. No-cost credit score tracking with weekly updates is provided through TransUnion.

Insurance 
SoFi has partnered with several third party insurance companies, such as Lemonade, Inc., in order to offer life insurance, auto insurance, homeowners insurance, and renters insurance.

References

External links

Social finance
Financial services companies established in 2011
American companies established in 2011
Peer-to-peer lending companies
Student loans in the United States
Companies based in San Francisco
2011 establishments in California
Online brokerages
Financial services companies based in California
Online financial services companies of the United States
Companies listed on the Nasdaq
Special-purpose acquisition companies
Banks based in California